Marine Corps Outlying Field (MCOLF) Camp Davis  is a military use airport northeast of the central business district of Holly Ridge, in Onslow County, North Carolina, United States. It is used as a training facility by the United States Marines of Camp Lejeune and Marine Corps Air Station New River.

History 
In December 1940, Camp Davis was built by the United States Army as an anti-aircraft artillery training facility. Camp Davis was attached to the First Army, Fourth Corps Area and held a complement of about 20,000 officers and soldiers. Between 1942 and 1943, two  paved runways were built for Camp Davis Army Air Field (AAF). Part of the runway for the airfield was built through one of the old Civil War fort's walls. Camp Davis AAF's Runway 5/23 was wider and was intended for use by transports, while Runway 19/01 was narrower and intended for use by single-engine aircraft. Most of the aircraft operated from Camp Davis runways were single-engine aircraft used to tow targets for the anti-aircraft artillery units. Women Airforce Service Pilots (or "WASPs") towed targets at Camp Davis. At least two were killed in flying accidents there.

During World War II the Camp Davis housed approximately 550 German prisoners. In 1944 the anti-aircraft training facility was transferred to Fort Bliss, and on 17 February 1946, Camp Davis was closed. In June 1946, a portion of the Camp Davis area formerly used by the Army as the Coastal Artillery Anti-Aircraft Firing Range (present-day Surf City, North Carolina) was transferred to the United States Navy. The Navy temporarily used the site for the development and testing of early surface-to-air missiles under the name Operation Bumblebee until 28 July 1948. Camp Davis was declared surplus and was dismantled for salvage and sale. At that time, the Navy apparently gave up the leases on the land, and it was returned to the original landowners.

In recent years, the Marine Corps has used Camp Davis as a landing field for helicopter units based at nearby Marine Corps Air Station New River. MCOLF Camp Davis has two runways which are designated 5/23 and 18/36. Both runways have concrete surfaces measuring 5,000 by 150 feet. The older runway 5/23 is not currently in use.

See also

 List of World War II military service football teams

Notes

External links 
  Abandoned & Little-Known Airfields: Camp Davis AAF / MCOLF (14NC)
 

Airports in North Carolina
Buildings and structures in Onslow County, North Carolina
Military installations in North Carolina
OLF Camp Davis
Airfields of the United States Army Air Forces in North Carolina